Jonathan Erlich and Andy Ram were the defending champions, but decided not to participate this year.

Austin Krajicek and John-Patrick Smith won the title, defeating Marcus Daniell and Artem Sitak 6–3, 4–6, [10–8] in the final.

Seeds

Draw

Draw

References 
 Draw

Odlum Brown Vancouver Open
Vancouver Open